Charles Henry Chatham (18 June 1910 – 24 February 1994) was an English cricketer: a right-handed batsman and right arm medium-pace bowler who played a single first-class match, for Worcestershire against Oxford University at The Parks in May 1934. He made 8 and 4, and took 1-49, his only first-class wicket being that of Edward Moss.

He was born in Tewkesbury, Gloucestershire, and died at the age of 83 in Cheltenham.

External links
 
 Statistical summary from CricketArchive

1910 births
1994 deaths
English cricketers
Worcestershire cricketers
People from Tewkesbury
Sportspeople from Gloucestershire